The 1968 Rice Owls football team represented Rice University during the 1968 NCAA University Division football season. In its second season under head coach Bo Hagan, the team compiled a 0–9–1 record, finished last in the conference, and was outscored by a total of 326 to 156. The team played its home games at Rice Stadium in Houston.

The team's statistical leaders included Robby Shelton with 594 passing yards and 681 rushing yards, Larry Davis with 410 receiving yards, and Tony Conley with 48 points scored.

Schedule

References

Rice
Rice Owls football seasons
College football winless seasons
Rice Owls football